The 2014–15 Turlock Express season was the fourth season of the Turlock Express professional indoor soccer club. The Express, a Pacific Division team in the Major Arena Soccer League, played their home games at Turlock Indoor Soccer in Turlock, California.

The team was led by general manager Matt Warner and head coach Art Pulido. The Surge finished the regular season with a 9–11 record, good enough for 4th place in the MASL's Pacific Division but not enough to qualify for post-season play.

Season summary
The team opened the 2014–15 season with a road loss to the Las Vegas Legends then won their next three games before dropping the three after that. The Sacramento Surge accounted for two of those three wins. The team regained its footing, winning 3 out of the next 4, but 4 consecutive losses in January put the team below .500 on the season and ended their playoff hopes. The team's 9–11 record includes a surprising 9 road losses. Turlock's only road win came early in the season at Sacramento.

History
The Express was founded as an expansion team for the Professional Arena Soccer League's 2011–12 season. Based in the league's smallest market, the team went 10–9 its first season and 9–7 the second, reaching the playoffs both times. The Express started the 2013–14 season strong with a pair of wins but then lost their next 7 consecutive games. The team improved in the second half of the season, Turlock finishing the season with a 5–11 record and averaging 521 fans per home game, but did not qualify for the playoffs.

Off-field moves
In May 2014, the Professional Arena Soccer League added six teams from the failed third incarnation of the Major Indoor Soccer League and reorganized as the Major Arena Soccer League. With the league expansion and reorganization, the other Pacific teams for 2014–15 are California-based Ontario Fury, Sacramento Surge, and San Diego Sockers plus the Las Vegas Legends and the expansion Seattle Impact. The Impact's assets were purchased mid-season and the team replaced on the schedule by the Tacoma Stars.

Roster moves
Defender and assistant coach Enrique "Queeks" Tovar was released by the team on January 29.

Schedule

Regular season

 Seattle Impact shut down mid-season; franchise purchased by Tacoma Stars

Awards and honors
Turlock defender Enrique Tovar was selected for the 2014-15 MASL All-League Third Team.

References

External links
Turlock Express official website
Turlock Express at Turlock City News
Turlock Express at Turlock Journal

Turlock Express seasons
Turlock Express
Turlock Express 2014
Turlock Express 2014